Terry Wilson may refer to:

Sports
Terry Wilson (American football), American football quarterback
Terry Wilson (Canadian football) (born c. 1942), Canadian football player
Terry Wilson (footballer, born 1959), Scottish footballer (Hibernian FC, Dunfermline Athletic FC)
Terry Wilson (footballer, born 1969), Scottish footballer (Nottingham Forest FC)

Others
Terry Wilson (actor) (1923–1999), American actor
Terry Wilson (musician), American musician
Terry Wilson (scientist), Polar researcher
Terry Wilson (police officer) (born 1964), Canadian hate crime investigator
Terry Wilson (politician), American politician